Požeg ( or ) is a small settlement in the Municipality of Rače–Fram in northeastern Slovenia. The area is part of the traditional region of Styria. The municipality is now included in the Drava Statistical Region. The Ljubljana to Maribor motorway runs through settlement.

References

External links
Požeg at Geopedia

Populated places in the Municipality of Rače-Fram